Hotel Torni Tampere is a 25-storey hotel in Tampere, Finland. It was completed in 2014. Hotel Torni Tampere is the tallest hotel building in Finland, and the second highest overall building in Finland after Majakka in Kalasatama, Helsinki.

On the top floor of the hotel building is the Moro Sky Bar, which is the highest bar and terrace in all of Finland.

See also 
Hotel Ilves
List of tallest buildings in Finland
Tampere Central Station
Tullintori

References

External links 

  (in English)

Torni
Torni Tampere
Skyscrapers in Finland
Torni Tampere
Torni Tampere